The 2021 Vijayawada Municipal Corporation election was held on 10 March 2021 to elect members to all 64 wards of the municipal corporation.

Election schedule

References 

2021 local elections in Andhra Pradesh
Vijayawada
Politics of Vijayawada